Elson Iazegi Beyruth (20 October 1941 - 15 August 2012) was a Brazilian footballer.

He played for clubs in Brazil and Chile.

Teams
 Flamengo 1959-1961
 Corinthians 1961-1962
 Flamengo 1963-1964
 Colo-Colo 1965-1972
 Magallanes 1973
 Deportes Antofagasta 1974
 Santiago Morning 1975

Titles
 Colo-Colo 1970 and 1972 (Chilean Primera División Championship)

References

1941 births
2012 deaths
Association football forwards
Brazilian footballers
CR Flamengo footballers
Sport Club Corinthians Paulista players
Brazilian expatriate footballers
Colo-Colo footballers
Magallanes footballers
Chilean Primera División players
Expatriate footballers in Chile
Expatriate football managers in Chile
Brazilian expatriate sportspeople in Chile
Deaths from diabetes
Pan American Games medalists in football
Pan American Games silver medalists for Brazil
Footballers at the 1959 Pan American Games
Brazilian football managers
Medalists at the 1959 Pan American Games